is a JR East railway station located in the city of Daisen, Akita Prefecture, Japan.

Lines
Jingūji Station is served by the Ōu Main Line, and is located 253.0 km from the terminus of the line at Fukushima Station.

Station layout
Jingūji Station consists of a single ground-level island platform, with the tracks a Platform 1 dual gauge for use by through traffic of the Akita Shinkansen. The platform is connected to the station building by a footbridge. The station is staffed.

Platforms

History
Jingūji Station was opened on August 21, 1904 on the Japanese Government Railways (JGR), serving the town of Kamioka, Akita. The JGR became the Japan National Railways (JNR) after World War II. The station was absorbed into the JR East network upon the privatization of the JNR on April 1, 1987. A new station building was completed in July 2008.

Passenger statistics
In fiscal 2018, the station was used by an average of 202 passengers daily (boarding passengers only).

Surrounding area
former Kamioka Town Hall
 Jingūji post office

References

External links

 JR East Station information 

Railway stations in Japan opened in 1904
Railway stations in Akita Prefecture
Ōu Main Line
Daisen, Akita